Snowpatch Crag is a  elevation glaciated mountain summit located in the Boundary Ranges of the Coast Mountains, in the U.S. state of Alaska. The mountain was named by members of the Juneau Icefield Research Project in 1964, and was officially adopted in 1965 by the U.S. Board on Geographic Names. Variant names for this geographic feature are "Snowpatch Peak" and "Snowpatch Craig."

Climate

Based on the Köppen climate classification, Snowpatch Crag is located in a subpolar oceanic climate zone, with long, cold, wet winters, and cool summers. Weather systems coming off the Gulf of Alaska are forced upwards by the Coast Mountains (orographic lift), causing heavy precipitation in the form of rainfall and snowfall. Temperatures can drop below −20 °C with wind chill factors below −30 °C. The months May and June offer the most favorable weather for viewing this peak.

See also

Geospatial summary of the High Peaks/Summits of the Juneau Icefield
Geography of Alaska

References

External links
 Snowpatch Crag weather forecast

Mountains of Alaska
Mountains of Juneau, Alaska
Boundary Ranges
North American 1000 m summits